Marko Vukasović (born 10 September 1990) is a Montenegrin footballer who plays for Serbian club Proleter Novi Sad.

He is the older brother of Mladen Vukasović.

External links 
 Profile at HLSZ.

References

1990 births
Living people
Sportspeople from Cetinje
Association football midfielders
Montenegrin footballers
FK Veternik players
FK Proleter Novi Sad players
Kecskeméti TE players
Vasas SC players
FC Chikhura Sachkhere players
FK Vojvodina players
Győri ETO FC players
Csákvári TK players
Serbian First League players
Nemzeti Bajnokság I players
Serbian SuperLiga players
Nemzeti Bajnokság II players
Montenegrin expatriate footballers
Expatriate footballers in Serbia
Montenegrin expatriate sportspeople in Serbia
Expatriate footballers in Hungary
Montenegrin expatriate sportspeople in Hungary
Expatriate footballers in Georgia (country)
Montenegrin expatriate sportspeople in Georgia (country)